BrewDog is a multinational brewery and pub chain based in Ellon, Scotland. With production of over 800,000 hectolitres, BrewDog claims to be the "#1 Craft Brewer in Europe". It was founded in 2007 by James Watt and Martin Dickie, who together own 46% of the company.

The company has been involved in a number of controversies. These have focused on its treatment of employees, use of unethical business practices, and hypocrisy in regards to its anti-establishment branding.

Products 
BrewDog produces various types of ales and lagers, and several kinds of spirits.

History 

BrewDog was founded in Fraserburgh in 2007 by James Watt and Martin Dickie. Dickie had previously worked at Thornbridge Brewery, where he helped develop their flagship beer Jaipur.

In 2009, BrewDog purchased its first bar, in nearby Aberdeen. At the end of 2018, the company and its franchisees operated 78 bars worldwide.

In 2011, BrewDog was described as "one of the prime movers" behind the campaign which changed the law in 2011 to allow new beer measures in Britain.

2011 also saw the company offered crowdfunding shares totalling £2 million, the equivalent of 8% of the capital of the company. The shares were sold at £23.75 and accompanied several benefits such as discounts in its bars and online purchase of its beers, and the opportunity to attend its annual shareholders' meeting.

The main brewing moved from Fraserburgh to nearby Ellon in 2012. In 2014, the company ended operations in Fraserburgh. In January 2013, BrewDog opened its new  brewery at a cost of £7.8 million just outside of Ellon. The brewery is designed to minimise carbon emissions with the use of treatment plants, Biogas technology and since 2021, an anaerobic digestion plant. In 2016, the Ellon distillery was expanded at a cost of £5 million including the addition of a new 300 hectoliter (HL) brew house.

In March 2015, BrewDog was awarded £1.5m in Regional Selective Assistance. That same month, the company announced plans to increase its workforce by 130.

In February 2016, BrewDog open-sourced its beer recipes to the public, making them a form of Free Beer.

Private equity firm TSG Consumer Partners acquired a 22% stake in the company for approximately £213 million in April 2017.

In February 2018, BrewDog announced that it planned to build a $30 million brewery and tap room on an  greenfield site in the Metroplex complex at Murarrie, in Brisbane, Australia. In November 2019, the company announced that it would be expanding its footprint in the United States with a new distillery.

In December 2019 BrewDog opened its first bar in Ireland, at the Capital Dock development in the upmarket Grand Canal Dock area of Dublin.

In January 2020, BrewDog opened its first alcohol-free bar in London. This closed during 2022.

In February 2021, BrewDog launched a new visual identity, which was designed by the London and New York based creative studio Made Thought.

During the COVID-19 pandemic, BrewDog shifted its distillery production towards making free hand sanitiser for local hospitals and charities.

In February 2023, BrewDog announced a partnership with Budweiser China and the expansion to this country's market.

Controversies 
BrewDog's provocative marketing has been a key aspect of its business, and has gained it substantial international coverage.

2007–2009 
In 2008, BrewDog was accused of aggressive marketing by UK drinks industry watchdog the Portman Group and risked having its products withdrawn from British shops. BrewDog denied these allegations and countered that Portman was impeding the development of smaller brewing companies. In December 2008, after an eight-month long dispute and a preliminary adjudication, which had ruled against the company, BrewDog was cleared of all breaches of Portman's code of practice and permitted to continue marketing its products without making any changes to the packaging. In response, BrewDog introduced Speedball, a reference to a drug cocktail, saying "...we thought we would give them something worth banning us for...". Speedball was promptly banned by Portman before being renamed as Dogma. BrewDog has produced progressively stronger beers and has claimed to have made the 'strongest beer ever brewed' more than once.

In 2009, its Tokyo* brew, with 18.2% alcohol by volume (ABV) caused controversy when Portman criticised the availability of a beer of that strength in 330 ml bottles with traditional crown caps. BrewDog also launched a beer called Tactical Nuclear Penguin, with 32% ABV, which was claimed to be the strongest beer ever made.

2010–2019 
In 2010, BrewDog announced Sink The Bismarck, an apparent 41% ABV to reclaim the world's strongest beer title from German brewery Schorschbräu, which had produced a 40% ABV version of its Schorschbock. Also in 2010, BrewDog produced a 55% ABV freeze-distilled beer called The End of History, with the bottles packaged in small stuffed animals, priced at £500 and £700 each. Only 12 bottles were produced; 11 for retail sale, with the other one going to video blog BeerTapTV. BrewDog claimed that this set new records not only for alcoholic strength in a beer, but also for price. Advocates for Animals called the gimmick "perverse".

The title “strongest beer of the world” was then reclaimed by Georg Tscheuschner from Schorschbräu, whose Schorschbock 57 had an ABV of 57.5%. The title for world's strongest beer has since been claimed again by Brewmeister's Snake Venom at a reputed 67.5%, although independent testing has yet to be published to confirm the ABV.

In 2014, Portman claimed BrewDog was in breach of Portman's Code of Practice "for encouraging both anti-social behaviour and rapid drinking" through the labelling of the Dead Pony Club IPA, which it claimed placed "undue emphasis on the strength and intoxicating effect of the alcohol in the product."

In September 2015, an advert branded as transphobic caused a petition against BrewDog of 7000 people.

In March 2017, BrewDog threatened legal action against an independent pub based in Birmingham called Lone Wolf, a trademark owned by BrewDog. A day later, after the story was reported in The Guardian, BrewDog director Watt tweeted that the company had no issue with the bar using the name, despite it having already rebranded as The Wolf. However, Brewdog released a statement at a later date saying "Hands up, we made a mistake in how we acted", blaming "trigger happy lawyers". The next day, further controversy arose over an alleged previous threat of legal action from BrewDog against a bar calling itself Draft Punk. BrewDog's Watt later released a blog statement citing the allegation as inaccurate, calling it an example of "opportunistic lies combined with inaccurate journalism", noting that BrewDog does also own a trademark on the word punk related to beer.

In March 2018, BrewDog produced Pink IPA, a limited edition bottling of Punk IPA brought out to coincide with International Women's Day and intended to highlight the gender pay gap. The launch of Pink IPA was met with criticism of the beer's marketing campaign. On the day following the launch of Pink IPA, BrewDog published an article responding to the criticisms and emphasising the intended satirical nature of the product. Later that year, the Portman Group ruled that the labelling for Pink IPA breached Portman's Code of Conduct, upholding complaints from members of the public that the phrase "Beer for Girls", used on the packaging, was likely to appeal to under-18s. In a statement responding to the ruling, BrewDog dismissed the Portman Group's findings, saying "We're as bothered about this Portman Group ruling as we are any other – that is, not at all." In 2020, BrewDog CEO Watt placed Pink IPA at the top of a list of his "Biggest Mistakes", acknowledging that "Despite the good intentions, our execution was terrible. ... The backlash was justified."

In May 2019, BrewDog was accused of stealing marketing concepts from public relations firm Manifest London, and from job applicants using fake interviews and other deceptive practices.

2020–present 
In June 2021, a group of over 100 former BrewDog employees published an open letter criticising the firm's business practices and the treatment of its employees. The letter cited a "culture of fear" and claimed the company was "built on a cult of personality", with founder and CEO Watt singled out for particular criticism.

Also in June 2021, BrewDog came under investigation by the Advertising Standards Authority (ASA) concerning the company's claim in three of 50 promotional tweets that ten 24 carat solid gold beer cans, randomly hidden in cases of beer, were worth £15,000. Some winners had their cans independently valued, uncovering that their cans were not solid gold as advertised in those tweets and were indeed gold-plated brass, valued at the lower price of £500. Watt contacted the 50 winners to offer a full cash amount, subsequently buying 40 of the cans out of his own money at a cost of £470,000.

In July 2021, a BrewDog advert was banned by the ASA for 'misleading claims'. An Instagram post for its Clean & Press Hard Seltzer stated, "Due to advertising regulations we cannot claim this drink is healthy," but continued with a reference to a low calorie claim. The ASA challenged the nutritional benefits of the drink claimed in the advert.

In January 2022, an episode of BBC One investigative series Disclosure interviewed "former employees who say they found it a miserable and uncomfortable experience," and "some loyal customers [who] now say they regret investing their savings in BrewDog." The Guardian later revealed that Watt had hired private investigators to obtain information on people he believed were propagating a smear campaign against him.

In November 2022, BrewDog's announced an "anti-sponsorship" of the 2022 FIFA World Cup, criticising Qatar for their mistreatment of migrant workers and criminalisation of homosexuality. The company also stated that profits raised from the sale of Lost Lager during the duration of the tournament would be donated to help fight human rights abuses. The Unite union accused BrewDog of hypocrisy, highlighting the company's own controversies regarding its treatment of employees. It was also pointed out by multiple news outlets that despite this stance, BrewDog was still planning to show the event in their bars and that their beer was still being sold in Qatar.

TV series
James Watt and Martin Dickie had a show in 2013 on American television channel Esquire Network which lasted three seasons. After the channel closed, BrewDog launched BrewDog Network, which features a selection of original content.

Awards 

BrewDog won the 2008 Prince's Scottish Youth Business Trust Young Entrepreneur of the Year award.

Paradox Grain won a gold medal at the 2008 World Beer Cup in the Wood and Barrel-aged Strong Beer Category.

BrewDog won the Tenon Entrepreneur of the Year Award for demonstrating exceptional vision and leadership at the 2008 National Business Awards for Scotland.

The Physics won World's Best Strong Pale Ale (Sub Category Winner) and Rip Tide won World's Best Imperial Stout (Style Trophy Winner) at the 2007 World Beer Awards, an annual competition organised by Beers of the World magazine.

Hardcore IPA won Gold at the 2010 World Beer Cup in the Imperial IPA category.

In 2012, BrewDog revealed that Diageo had threatened to withdraw funding from BII Scotland's annual awards if BrewDog won the Best Bar Operator award. Diageo later apologised to BrewDog for what it called a "serious misjudgement by Diageo staff".

In 2018, BrewDog achieved a two-star accreditation from Best Companies. In 2019, it achieved the lower one-star accreditation, with a BCI score of 666.2.

References

External links 
 

Breweries in Scotland
British companies established in 2007
2007 establishments in Scotland
Multinational breweries
Scottish brands
Companies based in Aberdeenshire
Pub chains